Janus Venter (born ) is a South African rugby union player for the  and . His regular position is hooker.

Venter was named in the  squad for the 2021 Currie Cup Premier Division.

References

South African rugby union players
Living people
1999 births
Rugby union hookers
Free State Cheetahs players
Cheetahs (rugby union) players
Rugby union players from Johannesburg
Griffons (rugby union) players